Harry Winston, Inc. is an American luxury jeweler and producer of Swiss timepieces. The company was founded in 1932 as Harry H. Winston Jewels, Inc. and changed its name to Harry Winston Inc. in January 1936. The company is named after its founder, Harry Winston, who was called by many as the "King of Diamonds".

Harry Winston is widely regarded as one of the most prestigious jewelry manufacturers in the world. The company has its headquarters in New York City, and is a wholly owned subsidiary of the Swiss Swatch Group, which acquired it from the Toronto-based Harry Winston Diamond Corporation in January 2013.

History

Early history 

American jeweler Harry Winston opened his first store under name Harry H. Winston Jewels, Inc. in 1932. In 1936, the company changed its name to Harry Winston Inc..

Harry Winston was the first jeweler to loan diamonds to an actress for the Academy Awards, in 1943; after dressing Best Actress nominee Jennifer Jones in his signature diamonds, Winston became popular with Hollywood celebrities.

Recent development 
After the death of the company's founder, Harry Winston, the company went to his two sons, Ronald and Bruce, who then entered into a decade-long battle over the control of the company. In 2000, Ronald, along with new business partner, Fenway Partners, bought Bruce out from the company for $54.1 million.

In 2010–2011, the company's sales were €246 million in total sales and €36 million in watches. The company also got a new CEO, Frederic de Narp, formerly of the Cartier North America. He succeeded Tom O'Neill.

On January14, 2013, Harry Winston, Inc. announced that it has entered into an agreement to sell its luxury brand diamond jewelry and timepiece division, Harry Winston Inc., to the Swiss Swatch Group. The transaction included the brand and all the activities related to jewelry and watches, including the 535 employees worldwide and the production company in Geneva, Switzerland.

Boutiques 
As of 2022, there are Harry Winston retail stores in ‌China, France, Germany, Hong Kong, Italy, Japan, Macau, Monaco, Russia, Singapore, Switzerland, Taiwan, Turkey, United Arab Emirates, United Kingdom and United States.

Noted acquisitions 

The company bought the flawless blue diamond The Winston Blue on 15May 2014.

See also 

 List of watch manufacturers
 Manufacture d'horlogerie

References

External links 

 New York Times article on Harry Winston Paris store heist

Design companies established in 1932
Companies based in New York City
Jewelry retailers of the United States
Watch manufacturing companies of the United States
Luxury brands
The Swatch Group
Retail companies established in 1932
1932 establishments in New York City
2013 mergers and acquisitions